Not For Broadcast is a full motion propaganda simulator developed by British video game studio NotGames and published by tinyBuild. The game released with its first episode in early access on 30 January 2020. The full game, including the third and final episode, was released worldwide on 25 January 2022.

The game takes place in an unnamed European country (resembling the United Kingdom) in the mid-1980s, where a new populist political party named Advance has won a surprise landslide election victory and begins to handle the country in an increasingly authoritarian dystopian fashion. The player takes the role of Alex Winston, a studio director in a national television station, having to produce a live broadcast, play adverts, censor swear words, and avoid interference in an effort to keep the viewership high.

On early access release, Not For Broadcast received positive reviews, with praise going to its gameplay and mechanics while being criticised for confusing political storytelling.

Gameplay

Broadcast days
The player plays the role of studio director Alex Winston in the production control room of the National Nightly News.

The player uses the vision mixer to select which camera feed to broadcast. After a two-second broadcast delay, the feed selected is broadcast. The player is required to censor any profanity or objectionable language by bleeping out the word as it is broadcast. At later levels, the player can also add sound effects such as applause and canned laughter to the broadcast. The player also uses a waveform monitor to control any interference. An audience meter gives feedback on the player's performance: good editing will help raise viewership, while poor editing, failing to censor or allowing interference to interrupt the broadcast will lower viewership. If the audience meter falls to zero, the player fails the level.

During each broadcast, the player selects three advertisements to play during breaks and which headlines to run in the first segment. The adverts and headlines selected influence the game outcome by promoting Advance or its rival Disrupt, increasing the player's earnings by promoting companies in which the player holds shares, or unlocking variations in the storyline.

At the end of each broadcast day, the player is graded on their broadcast, which affects his pay. The player is given the option to watch their broadcast as well as the unused footage.

Non-broadcast days
The protagonist has a life and family outside the broadcast room. This is represented through an "Incident system", a series of text-based choices in visual novel format where the player, based on a brief segment about their private life, makes decisions. These decisions are influenced by what the player chose to do in the Broadcast room. Sometimes, choices made in the incident system can also influence what happens in the broadcast room. Choosing certain options matter to the family, and they affect the dynamic and relationships the player character has with their family.

Plot 

The game is set in an alternate version of the United Kingdom from 1984 to 1991. The player is Alex Winston, who works at the nation's largest television broadcaster, Channel One, for the National Nightly News. Formerly a janitor, Alex is made broadcast engineer when their predecessor flees the country and Alex is forced to edit the election night broadcast in his place.

The story begins with the far-left progressive political party Advance, led by lawyer Julia Salisbury and television personality Peter Clement, winning an unexpected landslide victory. Advance implements a number of radical reforms, such as wealth redistribution, right to die policies and nationalisation of several large corporations. As time goes on, Advance becomes increasingly authoritarian in their governance, including limiting the freedom of the press and requesting censorship of anti-government statements. The resistance group Disrupt forms to counteract Advance's agenda.

The World Council, a United Nations-analogue, places harsh sanctions on the country, causing economic troubles, eventually causing Advance to declare war. Fed up with the increase in soft news stories and censorship, co-anchor Jeremy Donaldson snaps live on-air and holds the studio hostage at gunpoint. Depending on the player's response, Jeremy ends up committing suicide, shot dead by police, or arrested. Disrupt starts to infrequently hijack Channel One's broadcasts. 20 weeks later, Advance retaliates against the World Council by detonating nuclear explosives in four major cities on the continent and threatens to detonate more devices if the countries do not unconditionally surrender, causing Advance to win the war and annex Europe.

A year and a half later, Channel One has been nationalised, Disrupt has been branded as a terrorist group after staging attacks, and Peter Clement has died, presumably due to alcohol abuse. Disrupt spokesperson Alan James asks Alex to manipulate the broadcast to start an uprising against the Advance government. Advance are aware of the uprising and send in the military to defeat Disrupt. Depending on Disrupt's popularity and whether or not Alex successfully manipulates the broadcast, Alan either successfully retreats while bringing down the broadcast tower or fails to take down the broadcast tower and gets killed. If the broadcast tower does get taken down, Channel One temporarily ceases operations. Four and a half years later, the National Nightly News is rebranded as a soft media program called NNN. Advance attributes rapidly rising sterility to the bombs, and Advance propaganda has made its way into young minds.

Nearly two years later, the NNN has been rebranded as a talk show called The Nightly Show. Julia Salisbury appears as a surprise guest to present the winner of the National Anthem competition. There are four different final segments depending on whether Jeremy and Alan are alive or deceased, leading to Jeremy Donaldson interrupting the broadcast in order to question Julia Salisbury about the death of Peter Clement, Alan James taking the studio hostage in order to take it off the air, Jeremy Donaldson and Alan James interrupting the broadcast together, or the playing of the National Anthem without interruption. Each different final segment gives an opportunity to play a tape exposing either Advance or Disrupt, resulting in fourteen different epilogues depending on whether said tape was played, and the player's political stance (pro-Advance, pro-Disrupt, or neutral).

Cast 

 Paul Baverstock as Jeremy Donaldson, the male co-anchor of the National Nightly News
 Andrea Valls as Megan Wolfe, the female co-anchor of the National Nightly News
 Sarah Gibbons as Jenny, the floor manager.
 Jade Johnson as Robyn Shorte, a reporter.
 George Vere as Patrick Bannon, a reporter. Vere also plays Patrick's father, television personality Graham Bannon, in the telethon episode.
 Emma Mulkern as Not Patrick/Francis, a reporter who substitutes for Patrick Bannon.
 Claire Racklyeft as Julia Salisbury, a lawyer turned Advance co-leader and Prime Minister.
 Roger Alborough as Peter Clement, a television personality turned Advance co-leader and Prime Minister.
 Jonathan Hawkins as Alan James, a conspiracy theorist turned Disrupt spokesman.
 Dan Ellis as Geoff Algebra
 Adam Willis as Tommy Harris
 Helen Potter as Phillipa Rayden

Development 
The first episode of Not For Broadcast was released in early access on 30 January 2020, with the developers stating their intention to keep it in early access for approximately eighteen months while updating three free new episodes that caused the game's price to increase. Days before filming began for a second episode, the COVID-19 pandemic in the United Kingdom led to lockdowns which ceased all production. Instead of pausing production, the developers chose to create a bonus chapter titled Not For Broadcast: Lockdown, which contains a new storyline, with the cast being stuck at home "as they shelter from a rampaging horde of animatronic children's toys." The chapter was released alongside a new challenge mode, featuring 4 different challenge variations. Due to the lockdown delaying production on the game, the original plan to have 4 episodes was revised, and the story was rewritten to be told in three episodes instead. Finally, a year after the original release, on 28 January 2021 a second episode was released, which showcased impacts of certain decisions in previous chapters and was released together with an hour-long documentary titled "Not for Broadcast: Lights, Camera, Lockdown," about how the development team behind the game reveals how they managed to produce two video-filled updates of the game amidst a global pandemic. After releasing Episode 2, the production was halted once again by the COVID-19 pandemic lockdowns, which further delayed the release of Episode 3 until 25 January 2022.

Reception 

Not For Broadcast received generally positive reviews from critics both in early access and upon its full release. The game was complimented for its innovative concept and gameplay, including the satirical over-the-top content video segments and the production control room mechanics. Criticism went to its "on-the-nose political commentary" in the earliest early access version, with Cass Marshall writing for Polygon "[the game is] laying it on pretty thick." On Steam, the game has "overwhelmingly positive" user reviews.

According to Guinness World Records, the game has a record of the "Most Full Motion Video footage in a videogame", clocking in at 42 hours, 57 minutes, and 52 seconds. This, in turn, was also covered positively by multiple media outlets.

The game was nominated for the Seumas McNally Grand Prize at the 2023 Independent Games Festival Awards. It was also nominated for the "Outstanding Game, Simulation" and "Outstanding Writing in a Comedy" awards at the 22nd Annual NAVGTR Awards, both of which went to Japanese Rail Sim: Journey to Kyoto and Teenage Mutant Ninja Turtles: Shredder's Revenge. The game was also nominated for Game Beyond Entertainment at the 19th British Academy Games Awards.

Zero Punctuation named it the Fifth Best Game of 2022.

Future of the game
The game developers and TinyBuild announced on January 24, 2023, the development of three new episodes as DLC, this time for a fee. In the first, named Live & Spooky, the player will produce a horrific show set in January 1985, where journalist Patrick Bannon and other guests visit and attempt to solve the mystery of a haunted house. According to the few screenshots provided by the developers, this DLC would introduce new game mechanics. The release date of this DLC is announced on March 23, 2023. The second one will be called Bits of Your Life where the player will produce a broadcast where all the life of the two ministers of Advance will be told. Finally, the third and last episode will be called The Timeloop, where a scientist will present his new Time Machine.

Notes

References

Further reading

External links 

Developer website

2022 video games
Dystopian video games
Early access video games
Full motion video based games
Government simulation video games
TinyBuild games
Video games about toys
Video games developed in the United Kingdom
Video games postponed due to the COVID-19 pandemic
Video games set in the 1980s
Video games set in 1984
Video games set in 1985
Video games set in 1987
Video games set in the 1990s
Video games set in 1990
Video games set in 1991
Video games set in Europe
Video games with alternate endings
Windows games
Windows-only games
Works about censorship
Works about propaganda
Works about television